Geolycosa rafaelana is a spider in the genus Geolycosa ("burrowing wolf spiders"), in the family Lycosidae ("wolf spiders").
It is found in the USA.

References

External links
NCBI Taxonomy Browser, Geolycosa rafaelana

Lycosidae
Spiders described in 1928